The National Menorah is a large Hanukkah menorah located in the northeast quadrant of The Ellipse near the White House in Washington, D.C. It was first lit in 1979 by President Jimmy Carter, and has been erected and lit every year since.

History
In 1974 Rabbi Menachem M. Schneerson called for the public awareness of the festival of Hanukkah and encouraged the lighting of public menorahs. Although initially criticized by liberal Jewish organizations, Schneerson defended the campaign. In 1979, Abraham Shemtov of Chabad, sought to erect a menorah on the White House lawn. Cecil D. Andrus, the Secretary of the Interior initially denied Shemtov a permit to put a menorah on government property, saying it would violate the First Amendment.  Stuart E. Eizenstat eventually settled the matter and a permit was granted.

That year, President Jimmy Carter ended 100 days of self-imposed seclusion over the Iran hostage crisis by walking to Lafayette Park, and lighting the Menorah erected there by Chabad. Carter delivered brief remarks. Every president since has recognized Hanukkah with a special menorah-lighting.

President Ronald Reagan is credited with naming it the National Menorah in a statement read during the menorah-lighting in Lafayette Park in 1982.

The height of the hanukiah and platform are regulated by rabbinical law, which requires the menorah to be both visible (minimum height off the ground) and of a maximum height (a person must look upward but not uncomfortably so).

Event
The Menorah is erected each year by Abraham Shemtov and Levi Shemtov and sponsored by American Friends of Chabad-Lubavitch, as part of the campaign initiated by Rabbi Menachem M. Schneerson to raise awareness and hold public Hanukkah celebrations.

The National Menorah annual event is broadcast by C-SPAN each year. It includes a music presentation of festive Hanukkah songs by the United States Army Band. A U.S. ambassador or member of the cabinet has participated in the Menorah lighting each year. In 2004, all 50 U.S. governors issued proclamations in honor of the National Menorah.

Scholars have cited this initiative as a prime factor in Hanukkah becoming a widely celebrated festival.

Dignitary kindlers

Every year since then, a member of the President's administration has participated and made formal remarks during the lighting ceremony. Those who participated in the National Menorah event include:

1979: Jimmy Carter, President of the United States. 
1994: Joe Lieberman, U.S. Senator from Connecticut
1996: Stuart Eizenstat and Joe Lieberman
1997: Stuart Eizenstat
1998: Jack Lew
2000: Stuart Eizenstat
2006: Susan Schwab
2007: Michael Mukasey, U.S. Attorney General
2008: Joshua B. Bolten, White House Chief of Staff
2009: Rahm Emanuel, White House Chief of Staff
2010: David Bernhardt, U.S. Secretary of the Interior
2011: Jack Lew, Director of the Office of Management and Budget
2012: Jeffrey Zients, acting Director of the Office of Management and Budget
2013: Michael Froman, U.S. Trade Representative
2014: Joe Biden, U.S. Vice President
2015: Denis McDonough, White House Chief of Staff
2016: Adam Szubin, acting Under Secretary of the Treasury for Terrorism and Financial Intelligence
2021: Douglas Emhoff, Second Gentleman of the United States

References 

Hanukkah